The Rappaport family (Hebrew: רפפורט; Yiddish: ראפאפארט) is a prominent Kohanic rabbinic family, who are generally considered to possess the oldest and best recorded Kohanic pedigree. The modern origins of the family can be traced back to R. Meshulam Jekuthiel HaKohen Rappa (d. 1450) who settled in Porto, Mantua, Italy after the Jews were expelled from his hometown of Mainz, Holy Roman Empire. From the 17th century and onward, the Rappaport family occupied some of the most prestigious rabbinic positions in Europe, specifically in Eastern Europe. The Rapoport-Bick rabbinic dynasty is a branch of the Rappaport family.

History 
By the middle of the 17th century authors belonging to the Rappaport family were living in Poland and Lithuania, and were particularly concentrated in Krakow and Lviv; in the latter place, in 1584, was born the famous Talmudist R. Abraham Rappaport and R. Simhah Rappaport in 1650, the latter's son, R. Khaim Rappaport was the progenitor of the Rapoport-Bick dynasty and an ancestor of the Soloveichik dynasty. By the late 17th-century members of the Rappaport family lived in Dubno and Krzemeniec, where they occupied the town's rabbinate. By the 18th-century members of the family began to immigrate out of Eastern Europe such as R. Isaac Rappaport who lived in Smyrna and later Jerusalem and R. Solomon Judah Loeb Rapoport lived in Moravia. R. Solomon's grandson Arnold Rapoport [cs] was a leader of the assimilationists in Galicia and was a deputy of the Austrian Reichsrat from 1879 to 1907 representing the Polish party. In 1890 he was ennobled, receiving the title "von Porada". About 1750 there were two members of the Rappaport family living in Dyhernfurth (Silesia): one named R. Israel Moses and the other R. Meïr; the former came from Pińczów, the latter from Krotoschin who received a Coat of Arms. Some members of the family became involved in the Haskalah such as Charles Rappoport, Shloyme Zanvl Rappoport and Emil Stanisław Rappaport. That being said, the family still continued to produce rabbis such as R. David Rappoport and more currently R. Chaim Rapoport and R. Gamliel Rabinowitz-Rappaport.

References

External links and other articles
 Rapa: Elijah ben Menahem Rapa Elijah ben Menahem Rapa, or Elijah Rapaporto - Jewish Encyclopedia
 Portorapa: Simchah ben Gershon ha-Kohen Rapa (Portrapa) - Jewish Encyclopedia
 Rapa Porto: Menahem Abraham ben Jacob ha-Kohen Rapa (Porto) ; Menahem Rapoport - Jewish Encyclopedia
 The Center for the Study of the Rapaport Family
 Chapin, David A. and Weinstock, Ben, The Road from Letichev: The history and culture of a forgotten Jewish community in Eastern Europe, Volume 1.  iUniverse, Lincoln, NE, 2000.

Jewish surnames
Kohenitic surnames
Priestly families
de:Rappoport
ru:Раппопорт (фамилия)